Louis Neefs (born Ludwig Adèle Maria Jozef Neefs, 8 August 1937 – 25 December 1980) was a Belgian singer and presenter, known for his participation in the Eurovision Song Contests of 1967 and 1969.

Early career
Neefs was training for a career in technical drawing at college in Mechelen when he joined the college choir and started learning to play guitar. At first his musical activities were purely recreational, but by the late 1950s he had become a member of a group called Sun Spot. Via performances and talent competitions, Neefs' distinctive singing voice came to the notice of famous musical talent scout Jacques Kluger, who had also discovered, among others, Bobbejaan Schoepen. Kluger and Schoepen brought Neefs to the attention of record companies, and he was signed to a contract in 1958, releasing his first album in 1960. He achieved several top 20 singles in the Flemish chart, and a modicum of success in the Netherlands.

Eurovision Song Contest
In 1967, Neefs was chosen, with the song "Ik heb zorgen" ("I Have Worries"), as the Belgian representative in the 12th Eurovision Song Contest, which took place on 8 April in Vienna.  "Ik heb zorgen" finished in seventh place of 17 entrants.

In 1969, Neefs was again selected to represent Belgium, with the song "Jennifer Jennings" in the 14th Eurovision, held in Madrid on 29 March. This resulted in another seventh-place finish, of 16 entrants.

Later career
Neefs continued to enjoy recording success, with the biggest hit of his career, "Margrietje", reaching No. 4 in 1972. He was also the "voice" of Thomas O'Malley in the Dutch-language version of Disney's The Aristocats.

In tandem with his musical career, Neefs was a presenter of television and radio shows for Flemish broadcaster VRT. He also became politically active, standing as a councillor in Mechelen.

Death
Neefs was killed in a road accident in Lier on 25 December 1980, aged 43. His wife Liliane also died in the accident.

On 5 August 2007, a bust of Neefs was unveiled in his hometown of Gierle to honour what would have been his 70th birthday. Asteroid 38018 Louisneefs, discovered by Eric Elst at La Silla Observatory in 1998, was named in his memory.

References 
 

1937 births
1980 deaths
Eurovision Song Contest entrants for Belgium
20th-century Belgian male singers
20th-century Belgian singers
Belgian pop singers
Eurovision Song Contest entrants of 1967
Eurovision Song Contest entrants of 1969
People from Antwerp Province
Road incident deaths in Belgium